Ground-level power supply, also known as surface current collection or, in French, alimentation par le sol ("feeding via the ground"), is a concept and group of technologies whereby electric vehicles collect electric power at ground level from individually-powered segments instead of the more common overhead lines. Ground-level power supply has been used primarily for aesthetic reasons. During the late 2010s it has become more economical than overhead lines.

Ground-level power supply systems date back to the beginning of electric tramways, with some of the earliest such systems using conduit current collection. Since the turn of the 21st century, new systems such as the Alstom APS, Ansaldo Tramwave, CAF ACR, Elways, and others have been introduced which use modern technology to address some of the limitations and dangers of the older systems, and supply power for buses, trucks, and electric cars. With the increased efficiency and energy density of capacitor and battery powered systems, ground-level power supply systems are used in smaller portions of the line to charge the batteries, for example only during station stops for buses and trains.

Early systems

Conduit current collection systems were implemented as early as 1881 with the Gross-Lichterfelde Tramway. The system is primarily composed of a channel, or conduit, excavated under the roadway; the conduit is positioned either between the running rails, much in the same fashion as the cable for cable cars, or underneath one of the rails; a car is connected to a "plow" that runs through the conduit and delivers power from two electric rails at the sides of the conduit to the car's electric motor. Plows were manually attached and detached from cars as they switched rail lines.

Tram companies in Budapest trialed a conduit current collector system in 1887. Overhead lines were met with public opposition for aesthetic reasons, so the contractor Siemens-Halske implemented a concrete conduit underneath one of the trolley rails, with a narrow opening that allowed a "plow" to be inserted and make electrical contact with wires held by insulators at either side of the conduit. The system was used in several cities in Europe and the United States, where it was known as the "Budapest System". The system was generally safe, but tended to get clogged by mud and dirt. The system fell out of favor within a few years due to the cost of excavating the conduit, and was generally replaced with overhead lines.

Stud contact systems were implemented from 1899 to 1921. Systems by the inventors Dolter and Diatto were used in Tours, Paris, and several towns in England. Power was supplied from studs set in the road at intervals, which connected to the traveling cars with contact shoes or contact skis. The studs were cylinders with their tops flush with the road surface. Underneath there was a switch mechanism that made an electrical connection with the top of the stud when a car with a strong electromagnet at its underside passed over it. The Diatto switches contained mercury, which often leaked or adhered to the side of the cylinder and kept the exposed top electrified. The Dolter switches used pivot arms, which tended to get stuck in the electrified position. Similar systems were operated by Thomson-Houston in Monaco from 1898 to 1903, and by František Křižík in Prague on the King Charles Bridge from 1903 to 1908. Stud contact systems were short-lived due to safety issues.

Conduit current collection systems were used in several major cities, including Monaco, Dresden, Prague, Tours, Washington, and London, but posed maintenance issues and road safety issues. The Bordeaux conduit system remained the last in operation until being decommissioned in 1958. For 40 years, these systems were not reintroduced because they didn't meet modern safety standards.

Modern systems
A number of ground-level power supply systems were developed from the 1970s through the 1990s, but failed to reach commercialization due to reliability and safety issues. The first ground-level power supply system developed to modern safety standards was the Ansaldo Stream. After a competing system, Alstom APS, became the first commercially implemented system in 2003, there has been a proliferation of commercial implementations of ground-level power supply systems. During the late 2010s, ground-level power supply systems have become more cost-effective than overhead line systems.

Electric road systems

Electric roads power and charge electric vehicles while driving. Sweden has tested electric road systems that charge the batteries of trucks and electric cars, and among the tested systems are two ground-level power supply systems tested since 2017, in-road rail by Elways-Evias and on-road rail by Elonroad. Both systems were found to be more economical than the tested overhead line system and dynamic inductive charging system. The in-road rail system is planned to deliver up to 800 kW per vehicle traveling over a powered segment of the rail, and the system is estimated to be the most cost-effective among the four tested systems. The new systems are expected to be safe, with segments of the rail being powered only when a vehicle is traveling over them. The rails have been tested while submerged in salt water and were found to be safe for pedestrians. The co-director for one of the French Ministry of Ecology working groups on electric road systems stated that rail-based ERS are the most advantageous, though the specific rail technology has yet to be standardized. France plans to invest 30 to 40 billion euro by 2035 in an electric road system spanning 8,800 kilometers. Two tenders for assessment of electric road technologies are expected to be announced by 2023. Ground-level power supply technologies are considered the most likely candidates for electric roads.

Standardization
Alstom, Elonroad, and other companies have, in 2020, begun drafting a standard for ground-level power supply electric roads. The European Commission published in 2021 a request for regulation and standardization of electric road systems. Shortly afterward, a working group of the French Ministry of Ecology recommended adopting a European electric road standard formulated with Sweden, Germany, Italy, the Netherlands, Spain, Poland, and others.

The first standard for electrical equipment on-board a vehicle powered by a rail electric road system (ERS) has been published in late 2022. The standard, CENELEC Technical Standard 50717, specifies the following: an ERS voltage of 750 volts; a contact shoe capable of withstanding impact of gravel and similar road debris at the maximum operating speed; a weak link that breaks off the current collector at the structural fixing points if the force is larger than the maximum specified by the vehicle manufacturer; automatic monitoring of the presence of ERS infrastructure; automatic engagement and disengagement; a presence signal that may be analog or digital, and optional standard bidirectional communication; ease of inspection and replacement for the wearing parts of the sliding contact; and standard tests, markings, maintenance, and operational environment conditions. The 50717 standard does not encompass, but specifies for normative purposes, three architectures for ERS infrastructure: Type A architecture with two parallel surface-level conductive rails, one positive and one negative; Type B architecture with a single surface-level or raised track with short segments where each two segments in series have one positive and one negative segment; and Type C architecture with three parallel conductive rails, one positive and one negative below surface level in 1.5 cm wide channels, and one (or several) earthed at surface level.

Following standards, encompassing "full interoperability" and a "unified and interoperable solution" for ground-level power supply, are scheduled to be published by the end 2024, detailing complete "specifications for communication and power supply through conductive rails embedded in the road".

Modern implementations

Ansaldo Stream
The first modern ground-level power supply system to be developed is the Ansaldo Stream system. STREAM is an acronym that stands for "Sistema di TRasporto Elettrico ad Attrazione Magnetica", meaning "System of Electric Transport by Magnetic Attraction". The system uses a channel in the road made of insulating composite fiberglass material which contains a flexible copper strip; a vehicle passing over the channel with a special magnetic contact shoe raises the conductor to the surface, allowing power to flow to the vehicle. Segments of the strip are powered only when a vehicle passes over them. The system was developed in 1994 and trialed on a public tram line in 1998, which was eventually dismantled in 2012.

Alstom APS

Alstom APS uses a third rail placed between the running rails, divided electrically into 11-metre segments. These segments automatically switch on or off by radio control according to whether a tram is passing over them, thereby eradicating any risk to other road users. The tram has two collector shoes, and two segments of rail are active at any given time, to avoid interruption of power when passing between segments. APS was developed by Innorail, a subsidiary of Spie Enertrans but was sold to Alstom when Spie was acquired by Amec. It was originally created for the Bordeaux tramway, which was constructed from 2000 and opened in 2003, becoming the first modern commercial ground-level power supply system. From 2011, the technology has been used in a number of other cities around the world. Alstom further developed the system for use with buses and other vehicles, which it dubs Alstom SRS. Alstom SRS has been tested for compatibility with snow plows and for safety under exposure to snow, ice, salting, and saturated brine.

CAF ACR
Construcciones y Auxiliar de Ferrocarriles (CAF) trialed its Acumulador de Carga Rápida (ACR) ground-level power supply system in 2007 in Seville. Sections of the Seville MetroCentro tramway around the Seville Cathedral were converted to the ACR ground-level power supply system. ACR’s first commercial installation was aboard Urbos trams supplied to MetroCentro in 2011, allowing the permanent removal of overhead lines around the cathedral.

Line 1 of the Tranvía de Zaragoza has also used ACR since its second construction phase was completed in 2013. The use of ACR avoided the installation of overhead lines in the city’s historic centre.

ACR was included in the Newcastle Light Rail in Australia and Luxembourg's new tram system.

Ansaldo Tramwave
Derived from Ansaldo Stream and developed by Italian company Ansaldo STS (which later became Hitachi Rail STS), the Ansaldo TramWave ground-level power supply system successfully entered commercial application in 2017, with the opening of Zhuhai tram Line 1 first phase in China. The tram is the first fully low-floor tram system adopting ground level power supply technology. Later in 2017, Western Suburb Line in Beijing was opened with the same technology from Ansaldo. The technology has been licensed to CRRC Dalian and all the technologies were transferred to China.

References

External links
 

Electric rail transport
Tram technology